Charles Winston Dahlquist II (born August 5, 1947) is an American attorney and youth leader. He was the 20th Young Men General President of the Church of Jesus Christ of Latter-day Saints (LDS Church) from 2004 to 2009, and was the 10th National Commissioner of the Boy Scouts of America from 2016 to 2018.

Biography
Born in Provo, Utah, to Charles Winston Dahlquist and Afton Ahlander, Dahlquist grew up in Boise, Idaho. He earned a bachelor's degree from Brigham Young University and a J.D. from the University of Utah. He is a member of the law firm of Kirton McConkie and was involved in medical malpractice defense and risk management law. He married Zella B. Darley in the Salt Lake Temple on June 2, 1969, and they are the parents of five daughters.

LDS Church service
He served as a missionary for the LDS Church in the Swiss Mission in the 1960s and has been a stake president and president of the Germany Hamburg Mission.

On April 3, 2004, Dahlquist was sustained as the general president of the church's Young Men organization. It was the first time since Neil D. Schaerrer was appointed to the same position in 1977 that a church general authority was not the Young Men general president. Dean R. Burgess and Michael A. Neider were called as his counselors in the Young Men general presidency. In 2009, Dahlquist was succeeded by David L. Beck.

Scouting
Dahlquist has been involved in Scouting most of his life and is a recipient of the Silver Buffalo Award, the highest honor the BSA can bestow on an adult for service to youth. In August 2009, Dahlquist was named president-elect of the BSA's Great Salt Lake Council. In May 2016, Dahlquist was named as the BSA's National Commissioner.

References

External links
Charles W. Dahlquist II Official profile
Charles W. Dahlquist II Kirton and McConkie profile

American Mormon missionaries in Germany
General Presidents of the Young Men (organization)
Brigham Young University alumni
S.J. Quinney College of Law alumni
Mission presidents (LDS Church)
American Mormon missionaries in Switzerland
People from Sandy, Utah
Utah lawyers
20th-century Mormon missionaries
Living people
1947 births
People from Boise, Idaho
American leaders of the Church of Jesus Christ of Latter-day Saints
Religious leaders from Idaho
National Commissioners of the Boy Scouts of America
Latter Day Saints from Idaho
Latter Day Saints from Utah